The men's 110 metres hurdles at the 1958 European Athletics Championships was held in Stockholm, Sweden, at Stockholms Olympiastadion on 22, 23, and 24 August 1958.

Medalists

Results

Final
24 August
Wind: 0.8 m/s

Semi-finals
23 August

Semi-final 1
Wind: 0.9 m/s

Semi-final 2
Wind: 1.6 m/s

Heats
22 August

Heat 1
Wind: 1.1 m/s

Heat 2
Wind: 0.2 m/s

Heat 3
Wind: 1.1 m/s

Heat 4
Wind: 0.5 m/s

Participation
According to an unofficial count, 21 athletes from 15 countries participated in the event.

 (1)
 (1)
 (1)
 (2)
 (1)
 (2)
 (2)
 (1)
 (1)
 (1)
 (2)
 (1)
 (1)
 (2)
 (2)

References

110 metres hurdles
Sprint hurdles at the European Athletics Championships